Tabo is an archaeological mound site in Nubia, Sudan, in what was at one time the Kingdom of Kush. It draws its name from a small village, which is located near the ruins. Here at Tabo, there was a well preserved Amun temple. Based on these measurements, it is one of the largest Nubian temples. There was a courtyard with columns and a portico below. The temple is now heavily damaged, with local residents using this shrine as a quarry; the temple's stone blocks can be found in many of the neighboring villages.

Gallery

References
 Friedrich W. Hinkel: Auszug aus Nubien. Akademie-Verlag, Berlin 1978. (German)

Nubian architecture in Sudan
Archaeological sites in Sudan